The 2002–03 Duleep Trophy was the 42nd season of the Duleep Trophy. Instead of five zonal teams, five teams (Elite Group A, Elite Group B, Elite Group C, Plate Group A and Plate Group B) were formed based on the 2002–03 Ranji Trophy groups.

Elite Group C won the title by finishing first on the points table.

Points table

Source:

References

External links
Series home at CricketArchive

Duleep Trophy seasons
Duleep Trophy
Duleep Trophy